The George Washington Carver Museum may refer to several different things.  These include:

The George Washington Carver Museum in Tuskegee, Alabama, founded in 1941 by George Washington Carver
George Washington Carver Museum and Cultural Center in Austin, Texas
George Washington Carver Museum and Cultural Center, housed in the former Carver High School (formerly Phoenix Union Colored High School) in Phoenix, Arizona
George Washington Carver Museum in Dothan, Alabama (the "Peanut Capital of the World")
The Central-Carver Legacy Museum (formerly Carver High School) in Gadsden, Alabama
George Washington Carver National Monument in Diamond, Missouri